László Cseh Sr. (14 March 1952 – 24 August 2020) was a Hungarian swimmer. He competed at the 1968 Summer Olympics and the 1972 Summer Olympics. His son, László Cseh, is a six time Olympic medalist who has also represented Hungary in swimming at the Summer Olympics.

References

External links
 

1952 births
2020 deaths
Hungarian male swimmers
Olympic swimmers of Hungary
Swimmers at the 1968 Summer Olympics
Swimmers at the 1972 Summer Olympics
Sportspeople from Pest County